The Işalniţa Power Station is a large thermal power plant located in Işalniţa, Dolj County having 2 generating groups of 315 MW each for a total of 630MW of installed capacity. The power station formerly had a total of eight generation groups, three of 50 MW, one of 55 MW, two of 100 MW and two groups of 315 MW for a total of 1,035MW but six of these groups were decommissioned thus leaving only the two 315MW units.

A consortium formed by Alstom, Sumitomo and IHI Corporation was commissioned to upgrade the 315 MW group to 345 MW each at a total cost of US$315 million.

There are plans to add another generating group of 500 MW at Işalniţa Power Station that will result a total power generating capacity of 1,535 MWh at a cost of US$750 million.

The tallest chimney of the power station is 200 metres tall.

References

Natural gas-fired power stations in Romania